This is a list of people from Calderdale, a metropolitan borough of West Yorkshire, England. This list includes people who pre-date the creation of Calderdale, from the towns of Brighouse, Elland, Halifax, Sowerby Bridge, Hebden Bridge, Todmorden, and the smaller villages that make up the borough. This list is arranged alphabetically by surname:



A 

 Dicken Ashworth, Todmorden-born actor

B 
 Tom Bailey (1956), singer, songwriter, composer and musician for the band The Thompson Twins was born in Halifax.
 Christopher Paul Baker (born 1955), award-winning travel writer, photographer, and adventure motorcyclist from Brighouse; currently living in Palm Springs, California
 Paul Barker (writer) (1935–2019), journalist and writer, grew up in Mytholmroyd
 Antony Booth (1931–2017), actor and father of Cherie Blair; married to Stephanie Booth, a politician local to Calderdale; lived in Todmorden

C 
 Chipps Chippendale (born 1968), mountain biking journalist from Todmorden
 Prof. Sir John Cockcroft (1897–1967), Todmorden-born scientist who won the Nobel Prize for Physics in 1951
 Neil Cowie, Rugby League player for Wigan, Wales and Great Britain from Todmorden

D 

 Divina de Campo, a British drag queen and singer best known for appearing on the first season of RuPaul's Drag Race UK, born in Brighouse

E 

 Keith Emerson (1944–2016), pianist, founder and member of The Nice and Emerson, Lake & Palmer, born in Todmorden

F 

 John Fielden (1784–1849), land and factory owner in Todmorden; Member of Parliament; national leader of the Ten Hours Campaign for factory reform; scion of the Fielden family

 Samuel Fielden,  (1847 – 1922), socialist, anarchist, lay pastor and labour activist who was one of eight convicted in the 1886 Haymarket bombing in Chicago. Born in Todmorden.

H 
 Eric Harrison (footballer) Mytholmroyd born football/soccer coach for the Manchester United youth team during the reign of Sir Alex Ferguson
 John Helliwell, Todmorden-born musician of the band Supertramp
 Dale Hibbert, Todmorden. Original bass player with The Smiths, author of "Boy Interrupted"
 Ursula Holden-Gill (born 1974), TV actress (Emmerdale, Holby City, Teachers, The Bill)
 William Holt (1897–1977), Todmorden-born writer, painter, political activist, journalist and traveller
 Ted Hughes (1930–1998), Poet Laureate, born in Mytholmroyd

I 

 Innes Ireland (1930–1993), Formula One racing driver (1960s and 1970s), born in Mytholmroyd

J 

 Jollyboat, musical comedy double-act, of Todmorden brothers Tommy and Ed Croft
 Wilfred Judson (1902–1980), former Justice of the Supreme Court of Canada, born in Todmorden

K 

 Jason Kay, singer from the band Jamiroquai, owns a 'country retreat' (actually a small terraced house) in Todmorden
 John Kettley (born 1952), BBC weatherman, from Todmorden
 Julie Kirkbride (born 1960), Member of Parliament for Bromsgrove from 1997 to 2010

L 
 Fred Lawless, Liverpool born theatre playwright, has a house in Todmorden; was a writer for the BBC 1 TV series EastEnders and other TV and radio programmes
 Peter Lever (born 1940), England test cricketer, from Todmorden
 Anne Lister (born 1791), diarist
 John Lister (born 1847), politician
 Walter Livsey (1884–1978) Todmorden-born Hampshire wicketkeeper
 Adrian Love (1944–1999), World Service, Capital Radio and Radio 2 DJ
 Geoff Love (1917–1991), big band leader, born in Todmorden
 Jane Lumb, 1942–2008, actress and fashion model of the 1960s, born in Mytholmroyd

N 

 John Mitchell Nuttall (1890–1958), Todmorden-born physicist remembered for the Geiger–Nuttall law

O 
 Katie Ormerod, Olympic snowboarder

P 

 Wes Paul, Liverpool singer, musician and compere/stage manager of Sounds of the Sixties Cavern Showcase
 Wilfred Pickles (1904–1978), radio personality, born in Halifax
 Eric Portman (1901–1969), film and television actor, born in Ackroydon

R 

 John Ramsbottom (1814–1897), mechanical engineer and inventor from Todmorden

S 

 Derek Shackleton (born 1924), England test cricketer, from Todmorden
 Miles Balmford Sharp (1897–1973), artist
 Percy Shaw (1890–1976), inventor of the cat's eye
 Ed Sheeran, born in Hebden Bridge
 Harold Shipman (1946–2004), serial killer, took up his first GP's position at the Abraham Ormerod Centre in Todmorden
 Oliver Smithies (born 1925), U.S. geneticist and Nobel prizewinner, born in Halifax

T 

 Rebecca Taylor, Liberal Democrat MEP for Yorkshire and the Humber, born in Todmorden
 Grenville Turner (born 1936), a pioneer of cosmochemistry, from Todmorden

W 

 Sally Wainwright, screenwriter. Wrote several episodes of Coronation Street before going on to create At Home with the Braithwaites, Scott & Bailey and Happy Valley (TV series). Raised in Sowerby Bridge
 Prof. Sir Geoffrey Wilkinson (1921–1996), won the Nobel Prize for Chemistry in 1973, from Todmorden
 David Wilson, footballer who began his career at Manchester United (1980s)

See also 
 List of people from West Yorkshire

References 

 
Calderdale, List of people from
People from Calderdale